Chris Kannady (born July 29, 1979) is an American politician who has served in the Oklahoma House of Representatives from the 91st district since 2014.

References

1979 births
Living people
Republican Party members of the Oklahoma House of Representatives
21st-century American politicians